Achanum Bappayum is a 1972 Malayalam film directed by K. S. Sethumadhavan and written by K. T. Muhammed. It stars K. P. Ummer, Jayabharathi, Kottarakkara Sreedharan Nair, Adoor Bhasi and Baby Sumathi in important roles. It won the Nargis Dutt Award for Best Feature Film on National Integration. K. J. Yesudas won the National Film Award for Best Male Playback Singer and Vayalar Ramavarma won the National Film Award for Best Lyrics for the song " Manushyan Mathangale".

Plot
Krishnan (Kottarakkara Sreedharan Nair) a Hindu man comes back from the jail after completing his sentence for killing his wife. He starts staying with his  sister who is a follower of Sree Narayana Guru and her husband (Adoor Bhasi ) who is a communist. One night a Muslim lady comes to their house and dies leaving a new born baby girl. Krishnan decides to adopt the child even against the protest from his sister, brother in law and Muslim and Hindu communities. He allows the girl to learn Islam religion and follow it. But he faces more problems when the girl reaches marriage age and falls in love with his nephew.

Cast
 Kottarakkara Sreedharan Nair as Krishnan
 K. P. Ummer as Mustafa
 Jayabharathi as Aamina
 Adoor Bhasi as Madhavan
 Ayyappan Pillai
 Bahadoor as Abdulla
 Vincent as Devadas
 Master Raghu as Devadas
 Vijayakumari
 Meenakumari
 Philomina as Pathumma
 M. K. Kamalam
 Baby Sumathi as Aamina
 Sreemoolanagaram Vijayan

Soundtrack 
The music was composed by G. Devarajan and the lyrics were written by Vayalar Ramavarma.

Awards

National Film Award - 1972

Best Playback Singer - K J Yesudas

Best lyricist - Vayalar Ramavarma

References

External links
 Achanum Bappayum at the Malayalam Movie Database

1972 films
1970s Malayalam-language films
Films directed by K. S. Sethumadhavan
Best Film on National Integration National Film Award winners